Carter Mountain is in Shoshone National Forest in the U.S. state of Wyoming. Carter Mountain slopes gently up from the Bighorn Basin to the east but has steep cliffs on its western face. The region is well known for large herds of bighorn sheep, pronghorn and elk.

References

Shoshone National Forest
Mountains of Park County, Wyoming